Maamigili may refer to the following places in the Republic of Maldives:
 Maamigili (Alif Dhaal Atoll)
 Maamigili (Raa Atoll)